The 2015–16 season is the 88th season in CD Leganés ’s history and the 13th in the second-tier.

Squad

Competitions

Overall

Liga

League table

Matches

Kickoff times are in CET.

Copa del Rey

2nd round

3rd round

Round of 32

References

CD Leganés seasons
LEG